Operation Cupid is a 1960 British comedy film directed by Charles Saunders and starring Charles Farrell, Avice Landone and Wallas Eaton. The screenplay concerns a gang of criminals who win a marriage agency during a card game and plan to use it to arrange a lucrative marriage for one of their gang to an extremely wealthy heiress. It was made at Twickenham Studios in west London, for release as a supporting feature.

Cast
 Charles Farrell as Charlie Stevens
 Avice Landone as Mrs. Mountjoy
 Wallas Eaton as Cecil
 Harold Goodwin as Mervyn
 Norma Parnell as Lola
 Charles Clay as Mr. Cupid
 Wally Patch as Bookmaker
 Pauline Shepherd as Sylvie
 Neil Hallett as Tom
 Roy Jefferies as Insurance Representative
 Edward Malin as Smelly
 Audrey Nicholson as Nurse
 George Patterson as Monty
 Colin Rix as Postman
 Beth Rogan as Barmaid
 David Saire as Claude
 Bruce Seton as Representative
 Martin Sterndale as Foreman

Bibliography
 Chibnall, Steve & McFarlane, Brian. The British 'B' Film. Palgrave MacMillan, 2011.

References

External links
 

1960 films
1960 comedy films
British comedy films
Films directed by Charles Saunders
Films scored by Malcolm Lockyer
Films set in London
Films shot at Twickenham Film Studios
1960s English-language films
1960s British films